Norges Skaal was written in 1771 by Johan Nordahl Brun in Copenhagen during the period when Norway was in a personal union with Denmark, as a drinking song for the Norwegian literary society in Copenhagen.

“Norges Skaal” (also sometimes referred to as “For Norge, Kiæmpers Fødeland” from the first line of the song) was banned by Danish-Norwegian officials in 1772 when it was first performed, and it gained popularity in the early 1800s when Norwegian nationalism was increasing. It quickly gained a reputation as being anti-Danish and revolutionary, and was referred to as "the Norwegian Marseillaise". It was first published in 1782, and was an unofficial national anthem of Norway in the 1800s and beyond.

Lyrics

See also
Sønner av Norge
Ja, vi elsker dette landet

References

Historical national anthems
Norwegian culture
Norwegian anthems
1771 songs
1771 in Norway
Denmark–Norway